Meng Fei (born March 22, 1981) is a Chinese artistic gymnast. She won the silver medal in the uneven bars and the bronze medal in the team event at the 1997 World Artistic Gymnastics Championships. She was also a part of the silver-medal-winning team at the 1995 World Artistic Gymnastics Championships.

Currently Meng Fei is an optional team coach at Woodlands Gymnastics Academy in Spring, Texas USA.

Competition history

References

External links
 

1981 births
Living people
Chinese female artistic gymnasts
Asian Games medalists in gymnastics
Gymnasts at the 1998 Asian Games
Medalists at the World Artistic Gymnastics Championships
Asian Games gold medalists for China
Asian Games silver medalists for China
Medalists at the 1998 Asian Games
Gymnasts from Beijing
20th-century Chinese women